Burg Laudegg is a restored castle ruin near the three villages of Ladis, Serfaus, and Fiss, Bezirk Landeck, in the state of Tyrol, Austria. Across the Oberinntal valley lies Castle Berneck at Kauns.

Location 

History 
The tower house was built in the Early middle ages and is first documented in 1239. However, a local Ministerialeship of "Laudeck" (an earlier form of Laudegg) is documented even earlier (1232) in the court diary of Duke Otto von Andechs in Innsbruck.

In 1406 Oberinntal became involved in the Appenzell peasant uprising under Ital Reding the Elder. Ladis was razed to the ground, the castle and Steinegg Castle (above Tullenfeld on the way up to Pontlatzbrücke), which was serving as its barbican was also destroyed. In the following years, only the most necessary repairs were carried out, firstly under Maximilian I, who was interested in the region, the castle was expanded somewhat, but the promised funds were not sent. Though the castle was the administrative centre of Oberes Gericht valley (Laudeck Court) until the seventeenth century, it is documented in 1551 that the Keeper of Laudegg resided in Schloss Siegmundsried (built 1471) and the castle was no longer used as a camp or weapons store. In the seventeenth century it was renovated, but the building remained empty and fell into ruin for good after the administrative centre moved to Ried im Oberinntal.

Partial restorations began in 1964.  Today the castle is on private property, but is open for visiting once a week in the months of July and August.

Trivia
Castle Laudegg lies on the side of an ancient Roman road.
During visiting months, tickets are 2 Euros for Adults.

Further reading 
 Waltraud Comploy: Die Burgen Tirols am obersten Inn. Volume 1 of Kunstgeschichtliche Studien / Volume 74 of Veröffentlichungen der Universität Innsbruck. Kommissionsverl. d. Österr. Kommissionsbuchhandlung, 1972, Burg Laudegg, p. 37 ff.

References

See also
List of castles in Austria

Castles in Tyrol (state)
Castles in Austria